"Sax and Violins" is a song by the rock band Talking Heads and their final release. It appears on the soundtrack for the 1991 film Until the End of the World. It was also released as a successful airplay single and charted at number one on the US Modern Rock Tracks chart. The title is a play on the phrase "sex and violence".

The song was later released on the compilations Once in a Lifetime: The Best of Talking Heads and Sand in the Vaseline: Popular Favorites. It was released again in 2005 as a bonus track on the remastered edition of the Talking Heads' Naked.

"The music was written during the rehearsals and recording that led to the Naked LP," recalled David Byrne in the liner notes of Once in a Lifetime: The Best of Talking Heads. "I wrote the words later for the opening scene of Wim Wenders' Until the End of the World. The movie is supposed to take place in the year 2000, so I spent a lot of time trying to imagine music of the near future: post-rock sludge with lyrics sponsored by Coke and Pepsi? Music created by machines with human shouts of agony and betrayal thrown in? Faux Appalachian ballads, the anti-tech wave? The same sounds and licks from the 60s and 70s regurgitated yet again by a new generation of samplers? The Milli Vanilli revival? Rappin' politicos… sell your soul to the beat, y'all? Well, it was daunting… so I figured, hell with it, I'd imagine Talking Heads doing a reunion LP in the year 2000, and them sounding just like they used to."

See also
Number one modern rock hits of 1992

References

1991 singles
Talking Heads songs
Songs written by David Byrne
Warner Records singles
1991 songs